"Prove Me Wrong" is a song by Echo & the Bunnymen which was released in 1991. It was the second single released by the band with Noel Burke as the vocalist. It was also the band's first release with their new record label, Euphoric Records. The single was released as both a CD single (E001CD) and a 12-inch single (E001T) and it was self-produced by the band. The extra/B-side tracks, "Fine Thing" and "Reverberation" were recorded live by BBC Manchester.

Track listings
"Prove Me Wrong"
"Fine Thing" (live)
"Reverberation" (live)

References

1991 singles
Echo & the Bunnymen songs
1991 songs